Chronos is an EP by German metalcore band Callejon.

Track listing

External links 
 
 Chronos at Callejon's official website

2005 albums
Callejon (band) albums